Olivia Lufkin (born December 9, 1979), professionally known as Olivia, is a Japanese singer and songwriter. Lufkin began her solo career after singing in the Japanese girl group D&D. She gained mainstream success in 2006 after creating songs for the fictional band Trapnest under the alias "Olivia Inspi' Reira (Trapnest)." The songs were used for the popular anime adaptation of Nana.

Early life 
Lufkin was born in Naha, Okinawa Prefecture. She was born as the daughter of a Japanese mother and an American father. Her two younger siblings are Jeffrey Lufkin, a musician she regularly collaborates with, and Caroline Lufkin, an independent musician. In 1982, she moved to San Diego, California, then back to Okinawa. She later moved to North Carolina for two years before returning to Okinawa.

Career 
Olivia was discovered by the director of Rising Productions (Vision Factory) while attending the Okinawa Actors' School, subsequently signing to Avex Trax as part of the Japanese idol group D&D. Producer Tetsuya Komuro thought Olivia would be perfect for a project he was planning along with Jean Michel Jarre. The project was to create the theme song for the 1998 FIFA World Cup entitled "Together Now". The single was released a month after D&D's first and only album. It was then decided that D&D would separate into two groups: 'Olivia' as Olivia's solo project, and Aya & Chika as 'Aya & Chika from D&D'.

1999–2002: Solo artist 
Her first single, "I.L.Y. (Yokubō)," had a driving pop rock sound. While she did not write her first two singles, which were composed and produced by T2ya, she did write her third single, "Dear Angel" and most subsequent singles.

In 1999 and 2000, Olivia released six singles, all with a pop-rock sound. Toward the end of 2000, she released her first solo album, Synchronicity, which contained all singles released to date, five new tracks and one bonus track. It would peak at number twenty on the Oricon Charts.

After a hiatus of more than a year, Olivia began to take control of her career, releasing her seventh single "Sea Me" on December 12, 2001. This marks her switch to one of Avex Trax's sub-labels, Cutting Edge, from which she continues to release singles and albums. Her releases became increasingly rare and sporadic thereafter, with a video clips collection appearing four months later.

Olivia's next single, "Into the Stars," was planned to be released in July 2002 with an album at the end of the year. However, the single was postponed until September. The album release was similarly delayed.

2003–2004: New style 
2003 saw a complete style change and an onslaught of mini-albums as she began a series of collaborations with her brother, Jeffrey Lufkin. During this time, her music became considerably darker in both style and lyrical content. Instead of singles, four mini-albums were released exclusively through Tower Records Japan in Shibuya, Tokyo. These included Internal Bleeding Strawberry, Merry&Hell Go Round, Comatose Bunny Butcher and The Return of the Chlorophyll Bunny.

Alongside this, Olivia decided to launch a rare-items fashion label called Black Daisy Ville with her friend Friedia Niimura (Rin Kozue). This fashion line continued until the summer of 2004, featuring a line of clothes and accessories. Niimura later moved to the United States and the line discontinued.

In 2004, Olivia released her second album, The Lost Lolli. It featured the best material from her four mini-albums, and introduced two new tracks, "Alone in Our Castle" and "Fake Flowers", as well as two re-arrangements. The album was released nationwide with a limited first press version available at Tower Records Japan. "SpiderSpins (Lost Lolli Mix)" was used as a promotional radio single and video for the release. The Lost Lolli only peaked at #111 on the Oricon Charts. However, despite the moderate success of the album, Avex Trax released an overseas version of this album, reflecting Olivia's increasing success outside Japan. Typically, only chart-topping artists release overseas versions of their albums.

2005–2006: Hiatus 
After releasing The Lost Lolli, Olivia went on an unofficial hiatus except for a performance at the "Halloween of the Living Dead" concert hosted by Hyde on October 30, 2005. She continued to work as a fashion model.

In 2006 she provided vocals for the lead vocalist character Reira Serizawa in the fictional band Trapnest as a part of the anime adaptation of Nana. She produced songs under the alias Olivia Inspi' Reira (Trapnest) alongside fellow Avex artist, Anna Tsuchiya, who plays the role of Nana Osaki, the vocalist for Trapnest's rival band Black Stones.

The manga's author, Ai Yazawa, asked for Olivia when a staff member at Avex gave her a copy of Olivia's singles "Sea Me" and "Into the Stars". It is reported that she exclaimed, "It can only be her!" when she first heard the music. "A Little Pain" was Olivia's first release for this role in which she first made the general theme to the lyrics, then wrote the song in English. Later on, the lyrics were changed to Japanese. The single is about "Reira's loneliness, pain, and strength," as Olivia found that she could relate well to the character.

Olivia later said that her musical expression had changed, that the hiatus was because she had been "feeling pretty depressed," and "started to notice and realize a lot of her faults" and that her style "has gotten a lot more detailed," it's "pleasing to the ear"and "a lot cooler". Olivia had to research Reira's character, as she "never really read manga". "A Little Pain" is specifically tailored to the point of view of Reira. She states, "It was fun to sing as another person. Like an actress. I wrote the lyrics with the image that Reira looked to herself and wrote it. But because she's Reira, she has to help all around her, and that’s why it seems as though she sings for everyone, but she sings for herself. I wrote it with that idea in my mind."

When "A Little Pain" was first released, it reached number eight on the Oricon Charts, her first top ten hit. After the second week, this single had outsold the total sales for her debut single, "I.L.Y. (Yokubō)" which was her highest selling single to date at the time.

Olivia continued to release Nana-related material throughout 2006. The next opening and ending theme songs used were both by Olivia. The single "Wish/Starless Night" was released in October and peaked at number seven. Following the success of these releases, Olivia's first US appearance was scheduled for the Asian entertainment convention Pacific Media Expo held in Los Angeles, California in October 2006.

2007–2011: Modest success 
On January 17, 2007, The Cloudy Dreamer was released in CD and CD+DVD formats. The album debuted at number fifteen on the Oricon Weekly Charts - her highest ranking album to date. In addition to the singles previously released, the mini-album also featured the songs "Dream Catcher", which was used as the ending theme for the live action television drama series of Jigoku Shōjo; "If You Only Knew", which was used as the main theme for the Korean drama The Snow Queen; and an English version of "Wish". Later in February, the compilation album Olivia Inspi' Reira (Trapnest) was released featuring the singles from the Nana and some new songs.

Nana Best, another compilation album, was released shortly thereafter. This album featured the hit songs from the anime and one unreleased song by Olivia and Anna Tsuchiya. Olivia and Anna performed these songs together live at Shibuya-AX in March 2007.

On July 6, 2007, Olivia held a concert in Paris, France at the popular venue La Locomotive, singing songs from Olivia Inspi' Reira (Trapnest), The Lost Lolli and The Cloudy Dreamer. She made a guest appearance at the Japan Expo on July 6 and 7.

A new song, "Bleeding Heart", released on March 19, 2008, was a collaborative effort with her brother, Jeffrey Lufkin. It appeared on the Vision Factory compilation album Flower Festival: Vision Factory Presents.

Olivia released her sixth mini album, Trinka Trinka, on September 17 with all new material. It featured "Rain", which was used as the second ending theme to K-tai Investigator 7. The track lineup confused fans as a few of the track titles were changed, such as "Real Love", which she premiered during her Paris concert, which was renamed to "Your Smile". "I'm So Excited" was possibly retitled as "Trinka Trinka". Following the release of this mini album, Olivia held a live show on October 24, 2008, at Shibuya Womb.

On December 30, 2008, Olivia participated in a duo showcase with Inoran in which she covered a few of his songs such as "Owl's Tear" and "Monsoon Baby". They talked about their collaboration single which was released on April 15, 2009. It was titled "Sailing Free" and served as the theme song to a new game of the saga Sengoku Basara, called Sengoku Basara Battle Heroes. "Sailing Free" was her first single in three years.

Trinka Trinka was re-released in France it included "Sailing Free" and its b-sides ("Love Love Love" and "Undress") along with a bonus track which was revealed to be World's End Girlfriend's remix of "If You Only Knew". Olivia gave a concert for the visitors of the German anime convention Connichi at the Kongress Palais of Kassel (former Stadthalle Kassel) on September 10–12, 2010. Olivia talked about a new release, a greatest hits album that was released on October 13, 2010. This included two brand new tracks called "Sunlight" and "Be Your Friend". These saw another turn in Olivia's musical style, a combination of Trinka Trinka's pop style and The Lost Lolli's dark electronica.

Olivia's latest live appearance was at UppCon 2011, after which she took a hiatus from the music industry.

Personal life 
Olivia started working at a kindergarten in Okinawa, and later moved to California.

In 2012, she married Canadian Owen Vallis. They had a son Atlas in January 2014.

Discography

Studio albums

Extended plays

Compilation albums

Singles

As a lead artist

As a featured artist

Promotional singles

DVDs 
 Video Clips - Cutting Edge - March 13, 2002

Other appearances

Notes

References

External links 

  
  
  
 
 
 
 

1979 births
Living people
20th-century Japanese women singers
20th-century Japanese singers
21st-century Japanese women singers
21st-century Japanese singers
20th-century American women singers
20th-century American singers
21st-century American women singers
21st-century American singers
Ambient musicians
Anime musicians
Avex Group artists
Japanese alternative rock musicians
Japanese electronic musicians
Japanese women pop singers
Japanese women rock singers
Japanese women singer-songwriters
Japanese people of American descent
American people of Japanese descent
Musicians from Okinawa Prefecture
People from Naha
Trip hop musicians
Japanese women in electronic music